Cynophalla heterophylla is a species of flowering plant in the family Capparaceae. It is endemic to Ecuador.  Its natural habitats are subtropical or tropical dry forests and subtropical or tropical dry shrubland. It is threatened by habitat loss.

References

Endemic flora of Ecuador
heterophylla
Endangered plants
Taxonomy articles created by Polbot
Taxobox binomials not recognized by IUCN